

Belgium
 Belgian Congo – Martin Rutten, Governor-General of the Belgian Congo (1923–1927)

France
 French Somaliland – Pierre Aimable Chapon-Baissac, Governor of French Somaliland (1924–1932)
 Guinea – Jean Louis Georges Poiret, Lieutenant-Governor of Guinea (1925–1927)

Japan
 Karafuto –
Masaya Akira, Governor-General of Karafuto (11 June 1924 – 5 August 1926)
Katsuzō Toyota, Governor-General of Karafuto (5 August 1926 – 27 July 1927)
 Korea – Saitō Makoto, Governor-General of Korea (1919–1927)
 Taiwan –
Takio Izawa, Governor-General of Taiwan (1 September 1924 – July 1926)
Mitsunoshin Kamiyama, Governor-General of Taiwan (16 July 1926 – June 1928)

Portugal
 Angola –
 Francisco Cunha Rêgo Cháves, High Commissioner of Angola (1925–1926)
 António Vicente Ferreira, High Commissioner of Angola (1926–1928)

United Kingdom
 Malta Colony – Walter Congreve, Governor of Malta (1924–1927)
 Northern Rhodesia – Sir Herbert Stanley, Governor of Northern Rhodesia (1924–1927)

Notes

Colonial governors
Colonial governors
1926